Peter Perry (11 April 1936 – 19 April 2011) was an English footballer who played in the Football League for Rotherham United and York City. He was a member of Rotherham United's 1961 Football League Cup Final squad.

References

External links
 

English footballers
English Football League players
Rotherham United F.C. players
York City F.C. players
Gainsborough Trinity F.C. players
1936 births
2011 deaths
Association football defenders